Daniel Orsanic and Jan Siemerink were the defending champions, but Orsanic did not compete this year. Siemerink teamed up with Ellis Ferreira and lost in semifinals to Wayne Arthurs and Neil Broad.

Marcelo Ríos and Sjeng Schalken won the title by defeating Wayne Arthurs and Neil Broad 7–6, 6–2 in the final. It would be the first doubles title for both players and the only doubles title for Ríos in his entire career.

This tournament saw an unusual event, as all seeded pairs were eliminated in first round.

Seeds

Draw

Draw

References

External links
 Official results archive (ATP)
 Official results archive (ITF)

Doubles